Monkey Shines is a 1983 British psychological horror novel by Michael Stewart. Its plot follows a quadriplegic man whose service animal, a capuchin monkey named Ella, grows increasingly violent. It was adapted into a feature film of the same name in 1988 by director George A. Romero.

Premise
The novel follows Allan Mann, an Oxford law student who becomes quadriplegic after an accident, and is given a service monkey named Ella to help him with daily tasks. Ella, however, has been scientifically altered, and begins to channel Allan's inner fury, carrying out his most devious desires.

Critical response
Kirkus Reviews deemed the novel "Uneven in tone, with neither the sparkle of Michael Crichton nor the involving seriousness of, say, Richard Setlowe's The Experiment--but a lively, often intriguing smorgasbord of medical-ordeal, neuro-science, paranormal chills, and man/animal love-story."

References

External links
Monkey Shines at Goodreads

1983 British novels
1983 science fiction novels
1980s horror novels
British horror novels
Disability literature
Novels about animals
British novels adapted into films
Science fiction horror novels